Crivelli is a surname. Notable persons with that surname include:

Uberto Crivelli (died 1187), birth name of Pope Urban III
Carlo Crivelli (-), Venetian Renaissance painter
Vittorio Crivelli (-), Italian painter, brother of Carlo Crivelli
Taddeo Crivelli (fl. 1451, died by 1479), painter of illuminated manuscripts of the Ferrara school (also known as Taddeo da Ferrara)
Giacomo Filippo Crivelli (died 1466), Italian Roman Catholic Bishop of Novara
Lucrezia Crivelli, model for La Belle Ferronière, a mistress of Ludovico Sforza, Duke of Milan
Alessandro Crivelli (1514–74), Italian Roman Catholic bishop of Cozenza and Cariati and cardinal deacon
Giovanni Battista Crivelli (died 1652), Italian composer
Angiolo Mario Crivelli, also known as Crivellone (1658-1730), Italian painter, mainly of scenes containing animals
Giovanni Francesco Crivelli (1691–1743), Venetian mathematician and priest
Gaetano Crivelli (1768–1836), Italian tenor, regarded as one of the founders of that remarkable Bergamo tenor school
Giovanni Crivelli (painter) (il Crivellino), Italian painter of the 18th-century 
Domenico Crivelli (–1856), Italian-English tenor and singing teacher
Giuseppe Gabriel Balsamo-Crivelli (1800-1874), Italian naturalist and academician
Iseline Crivelli (born 1903, date of death unknown), Italian alpine skier
Alejandra Costamagna Crivelli (born 1970), Chilean writer and journalist
Federico Javier Crivelli (born 1982), Argentine professional footballer 
Manuel Crivelli (born 1993), Argentine handball player 
Victoria Crivelli (born 1990), Argentine handball player
Enzo Crivelli (born 1995), French professional football striker 
Dani Crivelli, former member of the Swiss hard rock and heavy metal band Krokus

it:Crivelli